The men's C-1 500 metres event was an open-style, individual canoeing event conducted as part of the Canoeing at the 1988 Summer Olympics program.

Medallists

Results

Heats
18 competitors were entered, but three withdrew prior to the heats. Held on September 26, the top three finishers in each heat moved on to the semifinals with the others were relegated to the repechages. Heat 2 was scheduled, but not held with all three competitors advancing to the semifinals due to an insufficient number of entrants.

Repechages
Two repechages were held on September 26 with the top three finishers in each repechage advancing to the semifinals. The second repechage was scheduled, but not held with both competitors advancing to the semifinals.

Semifinals
Three semifinals were held on September 28 with the top three finishers of each semifinal advancing to the final.

Final
The final took place on September 30.

Heukrodt was last at the halfway mark.

References
1988 Summer Olympics official report Volume 2, Part 2. pp. 343–4. 
Sports-reference.com 1988 C-1 500 m results.
Wallechinsky, David and Jaime Loucky (2008). "Canoeing: Men's Canadian Singles 500 Meters". In The Complete Book of the Olympics: 2008 Edition. London: Aurum Press Limited. p. 479.

Men's C-1 500
Men's events at the 1988 Summer Olympics